Bovisio-Masciago, is a comune (municipality) in the Province of Monza and Brianza in the Italian region Lombardy, located about  north of Milan.

Geography
Bovisio Masciago is located in the Po Valley, the foothills of the nearby hills of Brianza. It is a few kilometers from Milan (easily accessible thanks to the Northern Railways of Milan), Como, Saronno and Monza. The city is crossed from north to south by the River Seveso. Bovisio is one of the 16 municipalities of the Park and one of three common Groane Oasis LIPU (Italian League for Bird Protection) of Cesano Maderno.

History

Name
Bovisio Masciago arose in 1928, when the king of Italy Victor Emmanuel III, after consulting Italian Minister of the Interior Benito Mussolini,  fused Bovisio and Masciago Milanese. The village was called "Bovisio", but people of Masciago protested; so, in 1947, the municipality was called Bovisio Masciago.

Bovisio
The name Bovisio should come from the Latin bovis otium and would like to show that in this place the Roman army took the supplies and animals. The confirmation of the Roman origins of Bovisio occurred in 1935 when it was discovered in its territory, a Gallo-Roman tomb containing various household items.

Masciago
The name of Masciago also has Latin origin and should be derived from Martis ager (Field of Mars) and would indicate that the location, the Roman era, had been a military camp.

Economy
Formerly the main economic activity was agricultural, with many of the families engaged in the silkworm.
Since the 19th century the industrial sector gradually developed. One of the most important industries in Bovisio was that of the Zari family, whose activities started in 1867. The company produced wooden floors and furniture and sewing machines.  During World War I, Zari turned into a war industry producing wooden casings for aircraft.

Other  industries present at Bovisio included:
 Golden Auction Limited Company
 L.I.G.A. (Italian Rubber Processing and Related)
 S.A.R.A. (Anonymous Society of Bovisio Weaving)
 Cork Marangoni & C. (founded in 1882, was one of the largest cork in Europe)
 Furnace Solcia.

Currently none of these industries is active. The furnace and many of the old warehouses have been demolished. Some sheds still house small artisan firms, but there are plans to redevelop their total demolition of the old town.

Main sights
 Parish church of St. Pancrazio
 Ancient church of St. Martin Vescovo
 The parish church of St. Martin
 Villa Erba Odescalchi-Scotti (now Town Hall)
 Villa Sonzoni-Mariani-Compostela
 Villa Tanzi
 Villa Zari
 Villa Agnesi-Mariani-Radix-Ditches
 Villa Crofs

People
 Anselm IV (1097), Archbishop of Milan
 Maria Gaetana Agnesi (1718), linguist, mathematician and philosopher
 Luigi Maria Monti (1825), Blessed
 Franco Giorgetti (1902), cyclist and Olympic Champion, 
 Alessandra Fossati (1963), high jumper

References

External links
 Official website

Populated places on Brianza